Lamoreaux is an American English surname almost exclusively found in the United States, where it constitutes a variant of the more numerous French family name Lamoureux (from French l'amoureux for "the loving one", "the amorous one", "the lover").

Notable people
Notable people with this name include:
J. Neal Lamoreaux (1889–1954), American politician
Naomi Lamoreaux (born 1950), American economic historian
Rosa Lamoreaux, American soprano
Silas W. Lamoreaux (1843–1909), American lawyer
Wilbur Lamoreaux (1907–1963), American speedway rider

English-language surnames
French-language surnames
Americanized surnames